TRQ or trq may refer to:

 Tariff-rate quota, a trade policy tool
 Tarauacá Airport, in Acre, Brazil (by IATA code)
 Trique language, spoken in Mexico (by ISO 639 code)